Southend (formerly known as Grey Town and Grey) is a town and locality in the Australian state of South Australia located in the south-east of the state on the southern shore of Rivoli Bay about  south-east of the state capital of Adelaide.

The site of the town was selected by George Grey, Governor of South Australia before his departure in late 1845 and was approved by his successor, Frederick Robe, on 19 March 1846 with the town being laid out by Thomas Burr, the Deputy Surveyor-General later in 1846.  The town was originally named Grey Town which changed to Grey in 1912 and then to Southend on 21 October 1971.

Boundaries for the locality were created on 23 February 1995 for the portion within the local government area of the District Council of Millicent within the portion within the District Council of Beachport being created on 18 December 1997.  The boundaries include land extending from the coastline of the south-eastern end of Rivoli Bay in the west to the Southern Ports Highway in the north and to Lake Frome in the east including the government town of Southend and the former Southend Shack Site.

The Southend Caravan Park is in very close proximity to the white beaches of Rivoli Bay. The Bluff, less than a five-minute drive from Southend, is a popular scenic destination for locals and tourists. The Rivoli Bay Sailing Club sails catamarans and monohulls, and is located at the end of Leake Street. The club sails from October to April on weekends.

The locality includes the following protected areas - Canunda National Park which occupies land  in its south including the coastline up to Cape Buffon and Lake Frome Conservation Park which overlaps most of Lake Frome.
 
The 2016 Australian census which was conducted in August 2016 reports that the locality of Southend had a population of 263 people.

Southend is located within the federal division of Barker, the state  electoral district of MacKillop and the local government area of the Wattle Range Council.

References

Towns in South Australia
Limestone Coast